Manufacturers Association of Nigeria also known as MAN is a trade group headquartered in Lagos. The group act as a platform that manufacturers use to influence economic, industrial,  labour and social policy within Nigeria. The organization was founded in 1971 and was preceded by the Apapa and Ikeja manufacturers association. Other aims of the organization is to promote made in Nigeria products, advice  and partner with government on infrastructural facilities needed by manufacturers and improve the image of Nigerian products through encouraging members produce products meeting the standards of the Standard Organization of Nigeria.

Structure 
The organization has active branches in many states of the federation and in the specialized industrial zones of Ikeja and Apapa. MAN has a council headed by a President and a secretariat at Ikeja managed by a Director-General. The organization has ten sectoral groups made up of companies in related industries.

Activities 
As a representative body of manufacturers, MAN nominees represent the interest of manufacturers in the boards of a number of government institutions. Also, MAN has made recommendations to the government that have come to fruition. The Raw Materials Development and Research Council was established on the recommendation of MAN while it promoted the establishment of export credits and the Nigerian Export Promotion Council.

Key people 

●Mansur Ahmed-- President 

●Aliko Dangote-- Vice President, MAN Large Corporation Groups

●Kamoru Yusuf-- Chairman, MAN Kwara/Kogi Branch; Chairman, Manufacturers Basic Metal, Iron, Steel & Fabricated

●Funmilayo Okeowo-- Chairman, Pulp, Paper & Paper Products, Printing

References 

Manufacturing in Nigeria
Organizations based in Nigeria